Ramosch is a former municipality in the district of Inn in the Swiss canton of Graubünden. On 1 January 2013 the municipalities of Ramosch and Tschlin merged to form the new municipality of Valsot.

History
In 1956-58, on the hill Mottata (ca.  north-east of Ramosch), a significant prehistoric site was discovered. The Mottata site contains three settlement horizons, two from the mid and early Bronze Age (Laugen-Melaun/Luco-Meluno culture) and one from the early Iron Age (Fritzens-Sanzeno culture).

Geography

 
Of this area, 32.7% is used for agricultural purposes, while 26.5% is forested. Of the rest of the land, 0.7% is settled (buildings or roads) and the remainder (40.1%) is non-productive (rivers, glaciers or mountains).

The former municipality was located in the Ramosch sub-district of the Inn district. It is along the left bank of the Inn river. It consists of the village of Ramosch and the village section of Vnà as well as the settlements of Raschvella and Seraplana.

Until 1943 Ramosch was known as Remüs.

Demographics
Ramosch had a population (as of 2011) of 483. , 7.4% of the population was made up of foreign nationals. Over the last 10 years the population has decreased at a rate of -0.6%.

, the gender distribution of the population was 50.2% male and 49.8% female. The age distribution, in Ramosch is; 55 children or 12.5% of the population are between 0 and 9 years old. 34 teenagers or 7.7% are 10 to 14, and 29 teenagers or 6.6% are 15 to 19. Of the adult population, 37 people or 8.4% of the population are between 20 and 29 years old. 54 people or 12.3% are 30 to 39, 63 people or 14.3% are 40 to 49, and 54 people or 12.3% are 50 to 59. The senior population distribution is 42 people or 9.5% of the population are between 60 and 69 years old, 42 people or 9.5% are 70 to 79, there are 25 people or 5.7% who are 80 to 89, and there are 5 people or 1.1% who are 90 to 99.

In the 2007 federal election the most popular party was the SVP which received 45.6% of the vote. The next three most popular parties were the FDP (28.7%), the SPS (20%) and the CVP (5%).

In Ramosch about 59.6% of the population (between age 25-64) have completed either non-mandatory upper secondary education or additional higher education (either university or a Fachhochschule).

Ramosch has an unemployment rate of 0.62%. , there were 51 people employed in the primary economic sector and about 22 businesses involved in this sector. 89 people are employed in the secondary sector and there are 10 businesses in this sector. 70 people are employed in the tertiary sector, with 19 businesses in this sector.

The historical population is given in the following table:

Languages
Most of the population speaks Romansh (84.1%), with German being second most common (13.9%) and Dutch being third ( 1.1%).

Heritage sites of national significance
Tschanüff Castle, the Mottata (a prehistoric settlement) and the Swiss Reformed Church of St. Florinus are listed as Swiss heritage sites of national significance.

References

Valsot
Former municipalities of Graubünden
Cultural property of national significance in Graubünden
Populated places on the Inn (river)
Populated places disestablished in 2013